The Copper Scroll (3Q15) is one of the Dead Sea Scrolls found in Cave 3 near Khirbet Qumran, but differs significantly from the others. Whereas the other scrolls are written on parchment or papyrus, this scroll is written on metal: copper mixed with about 1 percent tin. Unlike the others, it is not a literary work, but a list of 64 places where various items of gold and silver were buried or hidden. It differs from the other scrolls in its Hebrew (closer to the language of the Mishnah than to the literary Hebrew of the other scrolls, though 4QMMT shares some language characteristics), its orthography, palaeography (forms of letters) and date (possibly overlapping the latest of the other Qumran manuscripts).

Since 2013, the Copper Scroll has been on display at the newly opened Jordan Museum in Amman after being moved from its previous home, the Jordan Archaeological Museum on Amman's Citadel Hill.

A new facsimile of the Copper Scroll by Facsimile Editions of London was announced as being in production in 2014.

History
While most of the Dead Sea Scrolls were found by Bedouins, the Copper Scroll was discovered by an archaeologist. The scroll, on two rolls of copper, was found on March 14, 1952 at the back of Cave 3 at Qumran. It was the last of 15 scrolls discovered in the cave, and is thus referred to as 3Q15. The corroded metal could not be unrolled by conventional means and so the Jordanian government sent it to Manchester University's College of Technology in England on the recommendation of English archaeologist and Dead Sea Scrolls scholar John Marco Allegro for it to be cut into sections, allowing the text to be read. He arranged for the university's Professor H. Wright Baker to cut the sheets into 23 strips in 1955 and 1956. It then became clear that the rolls were part of the same document. Allegro, who had supervised the opening of the scroll, transcribed its contents immediately.

The first editor assigned for the transcribed text was Józef Milik. He initially believed that the scroll was a product of the Essenes but noted that it was likely not an official work of theirs. At first, he believed that it was not an actual historical account; he believed it was that of folklore. Later however, Milik's view changed. Since there was no indication that the scroll was a product of the Essenes from the Qumran community, he changed his identification of the scroll. He now believes that the scroll was separate from the community, although it was found at Qumran in Cave 3, it was found further back in the cave, away from the other scrolls. As a result, he suggested the Copper Scroll was a separate deposit, separated by a "lapse in time."

Although the text was assigned to Milik, in 1957 the Jordanian Director of Antiquities approached Allegro to publish the text. After a second approach by a new director of Jordanian Antiquities, Allegro, who had waited for signs of Milik of moving to publish, took up the second request and published an edition with translation and hand-drawn transcriptions from the original copper segments in 1960. Milik published his official edition in 1962, also with hand-drawn transcriptions, though the accompanying black-and-white photographs were "virtually illegible". The scroll was re-photographed in 1988 with greater precision. From 1994 to 1996, extensive conservation efforts by Electricité de France (EDF) included evaluation of corrosion, photography, x-rays, cleaning, making a facsimile and a drawing of the letters. Emile Puech's edition had the benefit of these results.

Dating
Scholarly estimates of the probable date range of the Copper Scroll vary. Frank Moore Cross proposed the period of 25–75 CE on palaeographical grounds, while William F. Albright suggested 70–135 CE. Manfred Lehmann put forward a similar date range to Albright, arguing that the treasure was principally the money accumulated between the First Jewish–Roman War and the Bar Kokhba revolt, while the temple lay in ruins. P. Kyle McCarter Jr., Albert M. Wolters, David Wilmot and Judah Lefkovits all agree that the scroll originated around 70 CE. Contrarily, Emile Puech argues that the Copper Scroll could not have been deposited behind 40 jars after they were already in place, so the scroll "predates 68 CE."

Józef Milik proposed that the scroll was written around 100 CE. If this dating is correct, it would mean that the scroll did not come from the Qumran community because the settlement had been destroyed by the Romans decades earlier.

Language and writing style
The style of writing is unusual, different from the other scrolls. It is written in a style similar to Mishnaic Hebrew. While Hebrew is a well-known language, the majority of ancient Hebrew text in which the language is studied is generally biblical in nature, which the Copper Scroll is not. As a result, "most of the vocabulary is simply not found in the Bible or anything else we have from ancient times." The orthography is unusual, the script having features resulting from being written on copper with hammer and chisel. There is also the anomaly that seven of the location names are followed by a group of two or three Greek letters. Also, the "clauses" within the scroll mark intriguing parallels to that of Greek inventories, from the Greek temple of Apollo. This similarity to the Greek inventories, would suggest that scroll is in fact an authentic "temple inventory."

Some scholars believe that the difficulty in deciphering the text is perhaps due to it having been copied from another original document by an illiterate scribe who did not speak the language in which the scroll was written, or at least was not well familiar. As Milik puts it, the scribe "uses the forms and ligature of the cursive script along with formal letters, and often confuses graphically several letters of the formal hand." As a result, it has made translation and understanding of the text difficult.

Contents
The text is an inventory of 64 locations; 63 of which are treasures of gold and silver, which have been estimated in the tons. For example, one single location described on the copper scroll describes 900 talents (868,000 troy ounces) of buried gold. Tithing vessels are also listed among the entries, along with other vessels, and three locations featured scrolls. One entry apparently mentions priestly vestments. The final listing points to a duplicate document with additional details. That other document has not been found.

The following English translation of the opening lines of the first column of the Copper Scroll shows the basic structure of each of the entries in the scroll. The structure is 1) general location, 2) specific location, often with distance to dig, and 3) what to find.

1:1 In the ruin that is in the valley of Acor, under
1:2 the steps, with the entrance at the East,
1:3 a distance of forty cubits: a strongbox of silver and its vessels
1:4 with a weight of seventeen talents. 

There is a minority view that the Cave of Letters might have contained one of the listed treasures, and, if so, artifacts from this location may have been recovered. Although the scroll was made of alloyed copper in order to last, the locations are written as if the reader would have an intimate knowledge of obscure references. For example, consider column two, verses 1–3, "In the salt pit that is under the steps: forty-one talents of silver. In the cave of the old washer's chamber, on the third terrace: sixty-five ingots of gold." As noted above, the listed treasure has been estimated in the tons. There are those who understand the text to be enumerating the vast treasure that was 'stashed,' where the Romans could not find it. Others still suggest that the listed treasure is that which Bar Kokhba hid during the Second Revolt. Although it is difficult to estimate the exact amount, "it was estimated in 1960 that the total would top $1,000,000 U.S."

Translation

Selected excerpts

According to Eusebius' , "Achor" – perhaps being a reference to an ancient town - is located to the north of Jericho. However, in relation to the "Valley of Achor", Eusebius' view is rejected by most historical geographers, who place the "Valley of Achor" to the south of Jericho, either at the modern el-Buqei'ah, or at Wâdi en-Nu'eimeh. Elsewhere, Eusebius places Emekachor (the Valley of Achor) near Galgal. The "ruin in the valley of Achor" could be one of a number of sites: the ancient Beth-ḥagla, or what is also known as the "threshing floor of the Aṭad", the most famous of all the ruins associated with the nation of Israel and being about two miles from the Jordan River, or else the ancient Beth Arabah, and which John Marco Allegro proposed to be identified with 'Ain Gharabah, while Robertson Smith proposed that it be identified with the modern 'Ain al-Feshkha, or else Khirbet es-Sŭmrah, or Khirbet Qumrân.

The Hebrew word , translated here as "brick tiles", is used also in the Babylonian Talmud  16b and  3b.

There were several monuments of renown during the waning years of the Second Temple: that of Queen Helena, that of Yoḥanan the High Priest, both of which were in Jerusalem, or else outside the walls of the ancient Old City, etc. Since no location is mentioned, most scholars think that this is a continuation of the previous section.

The Hebrew word  is taken from the Greek word , meaning, "peristyle," a row of columns surrounding a space within a building. The Hebrew word, as explained by Maimonides in his Judeo-Arabic Commentary of the Mishnah ( 11:2), connotes in Arabic,  – meaning, the round stone slab laid upon the cistern's mouth with a hole in the middle of the stone. Since no specific location is mentioned, this section is thought to be a continuation of the previous two sections. Allegro surmised that this place may have been Khirbet Qumrân, where archaeologists have uncovered a watchtower, a water aqueduct, a conduit, and a very noticeable earthquake fissure which runs right through a large reservoir, besides also two courtyards, one of which containing a cistern.

The place-name Kuḥlith is mentioned in the Babylonian Talmud  66a, being one of the towns in "the wilderness" that was conquered by Alexander Jannaeus (Yannai), whose military exploits are mentioned by Josephus in his Antiquities of the Jews (13.13.3–13.15.5). Its identification remains unknown, although Israeli archaeologist Boaz Zissu suggests that it is to be sought after in the Desert of Samaria.

Libation vessels, (has the connotation of empty libation vessels that were once used to contain either vintage wine or olive oil, and given either to the priests or used in the Temple service, but which same produce was inadvertently mixed with common produce, and which rendered the whole unfit for the priests' consumption. The vessels themselves, however, remained in a state of ritual cleanness (Cf. Maimonides, Commentary on the Mishnah,  3:2;  3:4). The word  is a Greek loanword that found its way into the Hebrew language, derived from the Greek , and meaning simply an earthenware jar with handles. It is used in Mishnah  20:2,  5:5,  10:2,  4:4, et al. If so, it is a loanword derived from the Greek . The word may variantly be explained as "covered with ash." Though inconclusive, the idea of covering over such vessels with ashes was perhaps to distinguish these vessels from the others, so that the priests will not inadvertently eat of such produce, similar to the marking of a Fourth-year vineyard with clods of earth during the Seventh Year, so as not to cause unsuspecting people to transgress by eating forbidden produce when, normally, during that same year, all fruits that are grown become ownerless property.

In old Jewish parlance, as late as the Geonic period, the Hebrew word  (lit. "cave") signified a burial cave. Its linguistic use here, which is written in the construct state, i.e. "burial cave of…", points to that of a known place, Beit Ḥemdah (variant reading: Beit Hamara). The burial cave has yet to be identified. By "golden ingots" is meant "gold in its rawest form; an unshaped mass."

The "Eastern Gate" may be referring to what is now called the Golden Gate, a gate leading into the Temple Mount enclosure (cf. Mishnah,  1:3), or it may be referring to the Eastern Gate, also known as the Nicanor Gate (and which some scholars hold to be the same as the "Corinthian gate" described by Josephus, and alluded to in his Antiquities of the Jews), in the Inner Court of the Temple precincts (cf. Mishnah,  9:5).

In either case, the cistern was located on the Temple Mount, at a distance of 19 cubits from the gate (approximately 10 meters). The cistern may have been in disuse and was most-likely filled-in with stones and sealed. At present, there is no cistern shown at that distance from the Golden Gate on the maps listing the cisterns of the Temple Mount, which suggests that the cistern may have been concealed from view by filling it in with earth and stones. The cistern, one of many in the Temple Mount, is still used today for storing water, and which Claude R. Conder and Conrad Schick connected with the "Water Gate" of the Inner Court mentioned in Mishnah  1:4. Entrance to the cistern is from its far eastern side, where there is a flight of stairs descending in a southerly direction. By "channel" is meant the conduit that directs water into the cistern. The end of the entry is marked by two Greek letters,  (.

The term "the two houses" used here is unclear; it can be surmised that it may have meant an exact place between the two most famous towns that begin with the name "Beit", Beit Arabah and Beit-ḥagla. Both ancient places are in the Valley of Achor. Alternatively, Bethabara may have been intended as one of the "houses". The word that is used for "pots" is the same word used in the Aramaic Targum for 'pots'.

A description of the ancient aqueducts near Jericho is brought down in Conder's and Herbert Kitchener's Survey of Western Palestine (vol. 3, pp. 206–207). According to them, the natives knew of no such aqueducts south of Rujm el-Mogheifir. According to Lurie, the largest riverine gulch near Jericho with an aqueduct was Wadi Qelt (Wadi el Kelt), and which ran in an eastward direction, passing near Khirbet Kâkûn, whence it went down southwards about  towards the end of Wadi Sŭweid. Since the "head of the aqueduct" is mentioned, the sense here could imply the beginning of the aqueduct, which former takes its source from 'Ain Farah, 'Ain Qelt and 'Ain Fawâr and their surroundings, between Jerusalem and Jericho. Conversely, the reference may have been to one of two other aqueducts built during the Second Temple period (and subsequently refurbished) and which take their beginnings from a water source at 'Ain el Aûjah ("the crooked spring"), the one termed Ḳanât el Manîl ("the canal of el Manil") which bears east towards an outlet in the Jordan valley north of Jericho, and the other termed Ḳanât Far'ûn ("Pharaoh's canal"). Though inconclusive, the town of Sekhahka is thought by some scholars to be Khirbet Qumrân, which, too, had an aqueduct.

The riverine gulch that was once called Ha-Kafa has yet to be identified with complete certainty. The town Sekhakha, mentioned first in Joshua 15:61 and belonging to the tribe of Judah, also remains unidentified, although the Israeli Government Naming Committee has named a watercourse that rises from Khirbet es-Sumra and connects with Wadi Qumrân after its namesake. Scholars have suggested that Khirbet Qumrân is to be identified with the biblical Sekhakha.

Although the text is partially defaced, scholars have reconstructed it. The Hebrew word  (most likely used here in its most common sense, lit. "cave") is called here the "Cave of the Column", being a column that was well-known. The 6th-century Madaba Map depicts in it artistic vignettes, showing what appears to be a black column directly within the one northern gate of the walled city. Both the old Roman Gate at Damascus Gate and Zedekiah's Cave are on the north-west side of the city. Although inconclusive, the cave that is referenced here may have actually been Zedekiah's Cave (a misnomer, being merely a meleke limestone quarry thought to have been used by Herod the Great), and may have been called such because of its proximity to the black marble column. Others, however, date the erection of this black marble column in that gate to Hadrian, when he named the city Aelia Capitolina. Nevertheless, the same cave is also known to have pillars (columns) that project from some of the rock to support a ceiling. The leftmost passageway when entering the cave is the entranceway that faces "north" and which opens into a small recess. The identification here remains highly speculative, as Conder and Kitchener in their  also mention another place bearing the name Mŭghâret Umm el 'Amûd (Cave of the Pillars), along the south bank of Wadi Far'ah. Such jars were, most-likely, made of stone, since they were also used to contain the ashes of the Red Heifer and which vessels could not contract uncleanness.

Line 27 speaks about a queen, rather than a king. It is uncertain which queen is here intended, but the most notable of queens amongst the Jewish people during the late Second Temple period, and who had a palace built in Jerusalem, in the middle of the residential area known as Acra, was Queen Helena of Adiabene. The historian Josephus mentions this queen and her palace, "the palace of queen Helena," in his work The Jewish War (6.6.3.). Allegro incorrectly interpreted the word to mean "tomb," thinking it to be the queen's burial place. As for the precise number of talents, Allegro, in his revised edition, reads there 7½, instead of 27, because of the unusual shape of the last numerical character.

The ancient site of Dok is generally accepted to be the fortress Dok or Duq, mentioned in the First Book of Maccabees, and which same name appears as Dagon in Josephus' Antiquities of the Jews (xiii, viii, 1), and in his book The Jewish War (i, ii, 3). The site has been built and destroyed several times. In the year 340 CE, a Byzantine monastery named Duqa was built on the ruins of the old site, but it too was destroyed and has remained in ruins ever since. According to Lurie, a town by the same name has existed at the foothills of the mountain, built alongside a natural spring.

The location of the Kuzeiba has yet to be positively identified, although there exists an ancient site by its name, now known as Khŭrbet Kûeizîba, a ruin that is described by Conder and Kitchener in ' ' (vol. 3), a place situated to the south of Beit Fajjar and north of Siaîr, almost in their middle. A natural spring called 'Ain Kûeizîba is located nearby on the north-east side of the ruin.

The Kidron valley extends from Jerusalem to the Dead Sea, and its banks become more precipitous, in some places, as it progresses.

The sense of "mouth of the ravine" is generally understood to be the edge of a ravine. Beth-tamar has yet to be identified; although, in the days of Eusebius and Jerome, there was still a place by the name of Beththamar in the vicinity of Gaba, and which name was originally associated with Baal-tamar of Judges 20:33. To this present day, towards the east of Gaba, there are still precipitous cliffs and a number of ancient sites (now ruins), one of which may have once borne the name Beth-tamar. Félix-Marie Abel thought to place Beth-tamar at Râs eṭ-Ṭawîl (grid position 172/137 PAL), a summit to the northeast of Tell el-Ful. Others suggest that Beth-tamar is to be sought after around Jericho and Naaran, north of Jabal Kuruntul.

It is to be noted that the old Aramaic Targum on Judges 20:33 translates Baal-tamar as "the plains of Jericho". The word  in Aramaic/Syriac has the connotation of "a worker; a labourer; an artisan; a husbandman; a vine-dresser; a soldier." Lurie understood the same word as meaning "small", as in "the small dale". An unspecified consecrated object belongs to the priests of Aaron's lineage, while consecrated things given to the Temple's upkeep are not the property of the priests.

In the Land of Israel, dovecotes (columbariums) were usually constructed in wide, underground pits or caves with an air opening at the top, with geometric compartments for nesting pigeons built into the inner-walls and plastered over with lime. These were almost always built at a distance outside the city, in this case near the walled citadel or fort of Nabaḥ, a place that has yet to be identified. In Tosefta ( 9:3), it is mentioned that, during the Second Temple period, fledglings of pigeons (presumably raised in dovecotes) were principally brought from the King's Mountain, meaning, from the mountainous regions of Judea and Samaria.

Cisterns were large, bottle-shaped underground storage facilities usually carved out of the limestone and used to store water. The large riverine brook can be almost any large gully or gorge that drained the run-off winter rains into a lower region. The largest riverine brook nearest Jerusalem is Wadi Qelt, formerly known as Wadi Faran. The impression here is of a place that branches off from a larger brook, and where there are several irrigation channels that pass through it. Gustaf Dalman mentions several riverine brooks flowing, both, eastward and westward towards the Jordan River valley and irrigating large tracts of land along the Jordan valley. The nearest place to Jerusalem that meets this description is the area known as the King's Garden, on the southern extremity of the City of David, where is the confluence of the Kidron Valley with a dale known as the Tyropoeon.

French scholar A. Neubauer, citing the Church Father Jerome, writes that from Bethlehem one could see Bethacharma, thought to be the Beit HaKerem of Jeremiah, and what is widely thought to have been near to Tekoa. Conder and Kitchener, however, both from the Palestine Exploration Fund, surmised that the site of Beth-haccerem was probably to be identified with 'Ain Kârim. The Mishnah (compiled in 189 CE), often mentions Beit ha-kerem in relation to its valley, "the valley of Beit ha-kerem." Today, the ancient site's identification remains disputed.

The Hebrew word  denotes the "lower millstone" used in a stationary olive press. Its usage is found throughout the Mishnah. "Dale of the Olive" (the word  meaning "olive") being written here in defective scriptum. Allegro was uncertain of its reading. Although there may have been several places by the name Gei Zayt in the 1st century CE, until the early 20th century, there still existed a place by this name in its Arabic form, "Khallat ez-Zeitūna," meaning, the "Dale of Olives," and it can only be surmised whether or not the Arabic name has preserved the original representation of the older Hebrew appellation, as there were likely other dales bearing the same name. "Khallat ez-Zeitūna" is shown on one of the old British Mandate maps of the region and is located on the extreme eastern end of the Valley of Elah, where the western edge of the dale exits into the valley. Today, it is a narrow strip of farm land, flanked on both sides by hills, situated on the left-hand side of Moshav Aviezer as one enters the Moshav. Others read the text as "Dale of Provisions". The "black stones" are thought to be either basalt stones, which were carried there from far off, or "stones of bitumen."

The words "subterranean shaft" appear under their Hebrew name in the Mishnah ( 3:3 and  3:3) and Talmud ( 48b), and where one of which was built near the sacrificial altar on the Temple Mount in Jerusalem, down which flowed the blood and drink libations. The Hebrew word  (meaning "their measures") is derived from the Aramaic word , being a translation of the Hebrew  in Exodus 26:8, among other places.

Claims

The treasure of the scroll has been assumed to be treasure of the Jewish Temple, presumably the Second Temple, among other options.

The theories of the origin of the treasure were broken down by Theodor H. Gaster:
 First, the treasure could be that of the Qumran community. The difficulty here is that the community is assumed to be an ascetic brotherhood, with which vast treasures are difficult to reconcile. (Yet community, as opposed to individual, wealth for a future hoped-for temple is possible. Such is proposed by, among others, André Dupont-Sommer, Stephen Goranson, and Emile Puech.)
 Second, the treasure could be that of the Second Temple. However, Gaster cites Josephus as stating that the main treasure of the Temple was still in the building when it fell to the Romans, and also that other Qumranic texts appear to be too critical of the priesthood of the Temple for their authors to have been close enough to take away their treasures for safekeeping. (The Arch of Titus shows some Temple items taken to Rome.)
 Third, the treasure could be that of the First Temple, destroyed by Nebuchadnezzar, King of Babylon, in 586 BCE. This would not seem to fit with the character of the other scrolls, unless perhaps the scroll was left in a cave during the Babylonian Exile, possibly with a small community of caretakers who were precursors of the Dead Sea Scrolls community. (The scroll was written too late for this proposal.)
 Fourth, Gaster's own favourite theory is that the treasure is a hoax.

There are other options besides those listed by Gaster. For instance, Manfred Lehmann considered it Temple contributions collected after 70 CE.

Scholars are divided as to what the actual contents are. However, metals such as copper and bronze were a common material for archival records. Along with this, "formal characteristics" establish a "line of evidence" that suggest this scroll is an authentic "administrative document of Herod's Temple in Jerusalem." As a result, this evidence has led a number of people to believe that the treasure really does exist. One such person is John Allegro, who in 1962 led an expedition. By following some of the places listed in the scroll, the team excavated some potential burial places for the treasure. However, the treasure hunters turned up empty handed, and any treasure is yet to be found.

Even if none of the treasures comes to light, 3Q15, as a new, long ancient Hebrew text has significance; for instance, as comparative Semitic languages scholar Jonas C. Greenfield noted, it has great significance for lexicography.

It is more than plausible that the Romans discovered the treasure. Perhaps, when the temple of Herod was destroyed, the Romans went looking for any treasure and riches the temple may have had in its possession. The Romans might easily have acquired some or all of the treasure listed in the Copper Scroll by interrogating and torturing captives, which was normal practice. According to Josephus, the Romans had an active policy regarding the retrieval of hidden treasure.

Another theory is that, after the Roman army left after the siege, Jewish people used the Copper Scroll to retrieve the valuables listed, and spent the valuables on rebuilding Jerusalem.

Media

 A Long Way to Shiloh (known as The Menorah Men in the US) is a thriller by Lionel Davidson, published in 1966, whose plot follows the finding and contents of a similar treasure scroll.
 The denouement of Edwin Black's Format C: included using the Copper Scroll to find the Silver Scroll, giving the protagonists the information they needed to find and defeat the main threat of the book.
 The Copper Scroll is the subject of a political thriller, The Copper Scroll, by Joel C. Rosenberg, published in 2006. The book uses Rosenberg's theory that the treasures listed in the Copper Scroll (and the Ark of the Covenant) will be found in the End Times to refurnish the Third Temple.
 The Copper Scroll also features in Sean Young's historical novel, Violent Sands, in which Barabbas is the sworn protector of the Copper Scroll and the treasure it points to.
 The scroll—and a search for its treasures—was featured in a 2007 episode of the History Channel series Digging for the Truth. The program gives a basic knowledge of the research of the Copper Scroll and all the major theories of its interpretation.

Gallery

See also
 Kohlit

Notes

References

Works cited 
  (reprinted from Jerusalem editions, 1907, 1917 and 1988)
 
 
 
 

 
 
 
 

  
 
 
 
 
  Puech had access to the cleaned artifact and scans; Vol. 1, pp. 169–216 has his text, commentary and French and English translations.

Further reading 
 (papers delivered at the 1996 Copper Scroll Symposium)

 (Qumran and the Dead Sea Scrolls: Discoveries, Debates, the Scrolls and the Bible)

External links
 English text of Copper Scroll with explanatory footnotes 
 English text of Copper Scroll
 Hebrew text of Copper Scroll with English translation (work in progress)

Dead Sea Scrolls
Scroll
Archaeological artifacts
Jordan Museum collections
Ancient Hebrew texts
1952 archaeological discoveries
Jewish texts
Ancient Jewish history
1st-century Judaism